Juan Carlos Bolaños (born November 10, 1946) is a Mexican former racing driver from Mexico City. He was a long time sports car racer who practiced a car for the 1972 24 Hours of Le Mans but did not compete, but did drive in the 1975 24 Hours of Le Mans in the same Porsche 911 and finished 9th overall and 5th in class. The team moved up to a Porsche 935 Group 5 car in 1976 but failed to finish. Later in his career, Bolaños rented another team's car and competed in the 1980 CART Championship Car Primera Copa Indy 150 at Autodromo Hermanos Rodriguez in his hometown. He qualified 21st in the 25 car field but was knocked out after 9 laps by engine failure. He was one of three Mexican drivers to make their first and only CART start in the race along with Michel Jourdain Sr. and Daniel Muñiz. He was the national Formula Ford Champion in 1977 & 1978. He also raced at the 24 Hours of Daytona in 1975 starting 6th overall with a time of 1:58.952 in a 911 Porsche Carrera.

References

1946 births
Atlantic Championship drivers
Champ Car drivers
Living people
Mexican racing drivers
Trans-Am Series drivers
24 Hours of Le Mans drivers